Trần Phước Thọ (5 March 1993 – 17 April 2016) was a Vietnamese footballer who last played as a defender for the V-League club Đồng Tâm Long An He was a former member of the Vietnam national under-23 football team.

He died on 17 April 2016 due to a motorcycle accident. He was 23 years old.

References 

1993 births
2016 deaths
Vietnamese footballers
Association football defenders
V.League 1 players
People from Long An Province
Road incident deaths in Vietnam
Long An FC players